French Electro dance (otherwise known as Tecktonik and Milky Way) is one style of frenetic and quirky form of street dance typically performed to electro house music. It is based on, although is not limited to, a blend of different dance styles, such as industrial dance, Moroccan chaabi, disco, vogue, waacking, hip-hop and freehand glowsticking. It started in the 2000s and originated in the southern suburbs of Paris, France, mainly from the Metropolis nightclubs and has spread around the world. Fast-paced techno and electro house music imported from Northern Europe is the usual choice for Tecktonik dancing.

Electro dance is predominantly about arm movement, taking basic elements from glowsticking such as the concept of Freehand, the Figure 8 and the idea of the Leading Hand (one hand geometrically following the other), while staying very much in a disco taste, by amplifying points and poses as a main aspect to this style. Down below electro dancers tend to use their hips, knees and feet to gently shuffle across the floor in beat to the music, quite often in a random and jerky fashion. They also tend to include elements of toprock, b-boy-like footwork, lending to the hip hop-like influences in much of the electro house music.

The term "Tecktonik" is a registered trademark that began in Paris, and this has created issues for dance events or other uses of the name. The creators of the Tecktonik brand (most notably Cyril Blanc, the artistic director of Metropolis)  sell official products, such as clothes, Matts CDs, and energy drinks.

History  
In 2002, Cyril Blanc and Alexandre Barouzdin organized "Tecktonik Killer" parties under their project called "Tecktonik Events" whose purpose was to promote in France two styles of music which originated in Belgium and the Netherlands: hardstyle and jumpstyle. This project foresaw, in the Metropolis nightclub, the creation of three types of parties where DJs from the hardstyle genre would meet: "Blackout" evenings, "Electro Rocker" evenings and "Tecktonik Killer" evenings. Cyril explained that the name "Tecktonik" is a pun on the theory of tectonic plates.

Along with tecktonik killer parties, Cyril and Alexandre created, with the help of designers and sales staff, symbols that would surround the phenomenon: neon colors, mittens, tight clothing, etc. Given the success of these evenings, Cyril Blanc filed applications for "Tecktonik" and "TCK" trademarks at the National Industrial Property Institute (INPI), and internationally in 2007, to prevent other clubs from promoting their parties using those words. A number of products were then developed and marketed using these brand names, including clothing and an energy drink. Two other clubs in Paris then took over the Metropolis club; the Mix Club and the Red Light.

Tecktonik has enjoyed increasing success and has spread to France and Tunisia through gatherings in the street and videos available on the Internet. During 2007, mainstream media took interest in this phenomenon, further contributing to its spreading. The dance is known to the general public through its appearances in videos, including "Alive" by Mondotek, the Tepr remix of "A cause des Garçons" by Yelle, "Sucker" by Dim Chris, or songs by artists such as Lorie. In September 2007, the Techno Parade raised the visibility of Tecktonik.

In November 2007, TF1 became the official international agency for Tecktonik, with the goal of promoting the brand outside France.

Clubs must obtain permission from Cyril Blanc and Alexandre Barouzdin to use the term "Tecktonik" or "TCK".

References

External links
Vertifight

Urban street dance and music
Dance culture